

Events

Pre-1600
567 BC – Servius Tullius, the king of Rome, celebrates a triumph for his victory over the Etruscans.
240 BC – First recorded perihelion passage of Halley's Comet.
1085 – Alfonso VI of Castile takes Toledo, Spain, back from the Moors.
1420 – Henry the Navigator is appointed governor of the Order of Christ.
1521 – The Diet of Worms ends when Charles V, Holy Roman Emperor, issues the Edict of Worms, declaring Martin Luther an outlaw.

1601–1900
1644 – Ming general Wu Sangui forms an alliance with the invading Manchus and opens the gates of the Great Wall of China at Shanhaiguan pass, letting the Manchus through towards the capital Beijing.
1659 – Richard Cromwell resigns as Lord Protector of England following the restoration of the Long Parliament, beginning a second brief period of the republican government called the Commonwealth of England.
1660 – Charles II lands at Dover at the invitation of the Convention Parliament, which marks the end of the Cromwell-proclaimed Commonwealth of England, Scotland and Ireland and begins the Restoration of the British monarchy.
1738 – A treaty between Pennsylvania and Maryland ends the Conojocular War with settlement of a boundary dispute and exchange of prisoners.
1787 – After a delay of 11 days, the United States Constitutional Convention formally convenes in Philadelphia after a quorum of seven states is secured.
1798 – United Irishmen Rebellion: Battle of Carlow begins; executions of suspected rebels at Carnew and at Dunlavin Green take place.
1809 – Chuquisaca Revolution: Patriot revolt in Chuquisaca (modern-day Sucre) against the Spanish Empire, sparking the Latin American wars of independence.
1810 – May Revolution: Citizens of Buenos Aires expel Viceroy Baltasar Hidalgo de Cisneros during the "May Week", starting the Argentine War of Independence.
1819 – The Argentine Constitution of 1819 is promulgated.
1833 – The Chilean Constitution of 1833 is promulgated.
1865 – In Mobile, Alabama, around 300 people are killed when an ordnance depot explodes.
1878 – Gilbert and Sullivan's comic opera H.M.S. Pinafore opens at the Opera Comique in London.
1895 – Playwright, poet and novelist Oscar Wilde is convicted of "committing acts of gross indecency with other male persons" and sentenced to serve two years in prison.
  1895   – The Republic of Formosa is formed, with Tang Jingsong as its president.

1901–present
1914 – The House of Commons of the United Kingdom passes the Home Rule Bill for devolution in Ireland.
1925 – Scopes Trial: John T. Scopes is indicted for teaching human evolution in Tennessee.
1926 – Sholom Schwartzbard assassinates Symon Petliura, the head of the government of the Ukrainian People's Republic, which is in government-in-exile in Paris.
1933 – The Walt Disney Company cartoon Three Little Pigs premieres at Radio City Music Hall, featuring the hit song "Who's Afraid of the Big Bad Wolf?"
1935 – Jesse Owens of Ohio State University breaks three world records and ties a fourth at the Big Ten Conference Track and Field Championships in Ann Arbor, Michigan.
1938 – Spanish Civil War: The bombing of Alicante kills 313 people.
1940 – World War II: The German 2nd Panzer Division captures the port of Boulogne-sur-Mer; the surrender of the last French and British troops marks the end of the Battle of Boulogne.
1946 – The parliament of Transjordan makes Abdullah I of Jordan their Emir.
1953 – Nuclear weapons testing: At the Nevada Test Site, the United States conducts its first and only nuclear artillery test.
  1953   – The first public television station in the United States officially begins broadcasting as KUHT from the campus of the University of Houston.
1955 – In the United States, a night-time F5 tornado strikes the small city of Udall, Kansas, killing 80 and injuring 273. It is the deadliest tornado to ever occur in the state and the 23rd deadliest in the U.S.
  1955   – First ascent of Mount Kangchenjunga: On the British Kangchenjunga expedition led by Charles Evans, Joe Brown and George Band reach the summit of the third-highest mountain in the world (8,586 meters); Norman Hardie and Tony Streather join them the following day.
1961 – Apollo program: U.S. President John F. Kennedy announces, before a special joint session of the U.S. Congress, his goal to initiate a project to put a "man on the Moon" before the end of the decade.
1963 – The Organisation of African Unity is established in Addis Ababa, Ethiopia.
1966 – Explorer program: Explorer 32 launches.
1968 – The Gateway Arch in St. Louis, Missouri, is dedicated.
1973 – In protest against the dictatorship in Greece, the captain and crew on Greek naval destroyer  mutiny and refuse to return to Greece, instead anchoring at Fiumicino, Italy.
1977 – Star Wars (retroactively titled Star Wars: Episode IV – A New Hope) is released in theaters.
  1977   – The Chinese government removes a decade-old ban on William Shakespeare's work, effectively ending the Cultural Revolution started in 1966.
1978 – The first of a series of bombings orchestrated by the Unabomber detonates at Northwestern University resulting in minor injuries.
1979 – John Spenkelink, a convicted murderer, is executed in Florida; he is the first person to be executed in the state after the reintroduction of capital punishment in 1976.
  1979   – American Airlines Flight 191: A McDonnell Douglas DC-10 crashes during takeoff at O'Hare International Airport, Chicago, killing all 271 on board and two people on the ground.
1981 – In Riyadh, the Gulf Cooperation Council is created between Bahrain, Kuwait, Oman, Qatar, Saudi Arabia and the United Arab Emirates.
1982 – Falklands War: HMS Coventry is sunk by Argentine Air Force A-4 Skyhawks.
1985 – Bangladesh is hit by a tropical cyclone and storm surge, which kills approximately 10,000 people.
1986 – The Hands Across America event takes place.
1997 – A military coup in Sierra Leone replaces President Ahmad Tejan Kabbah with Major Johnny Paul Koroma.
1999 – The United States House of Representatives releases the Cox Report which details China's nuclear espionage against the U.S. over the prior two decades.
2000 – Liberation Day of Lebanon: Israel withdraws its army from Lebanese territory (with the exception of the disputed Shebaa farms zone) 18 years after the invasion of 1982.
2001 – Erik Weihenmayer becomes the first blind person to reach the summit of Mount Everest, in the Himalayas, with Dr. Sherman Bull.
2002 – China Airlines Flight 611 disintegrates in mid-air and crashes into the Taiwan Strait, with the loss of all 225 people on board.
2008 – NASA's Phoenix lander touches down in the Green Valley region of Mars to search for environments suitable for water and microbial life.
2009 – North Korea allegedly tests its second nuclear device, after which Pyongyang also conducts several missile tests, building tensions in the international community.
2011 – Oprah Winfrey airs her last show, ending her 25-year run of The Oprah Winfrey Show.
2012 – The SpaceX Dragon 1 becomes the first commercial spacecraft to successfully rendezvous and berth with the International Space Station.
2013 – Suspected Maoist rebels kill at least 28 people and injure 32 others in an attack on a convoy of Indian National Congress politicians in Chhattisgarh, India.
  2013   – A gas cylinder explodes on a school bus in the Pakistani city of Gujrat, killing at least 18 people.
2018 – The General Data Protection Regulation (GDPR) becomes enforceable in the European Union.
  2018   – Ireland votes to repeal the Eighth Amendment of their constitution that prohibits abortion in all but a few cases, choosing to replace it with the Thirty-sixth Amendment of the Constitution of Ireland.

Births

Pre-1600
1048 – Emperor Shenzong of Song (d. 1085)
1320 – Toghon Temür, Mongolian emperor (d. 1370)
1334 – Emperor Sukō of Japan (d. 1398)
1416 – Jakobus ("James"), Count of Lichtenburg (d. 1480)
1417 – Catherine of Cleves, Duchess consort regent of Guelders (d. 1479)
1550 – Camillus de Lellis, Italian saint and nurse (d. 1614)

1601–1900
1606 – Charles Garnier, French missionary and saint (d. 1649)
1661 – Claude Buffier, Polish-French historian and philosopher (d. 1737)
1713 – John Stuart, 3rd Earl of Bute, Scottish politician, Prime Minister of the United Kingdom (d. 1792)
1725 – Samuel Ward, American politician, 31st and 33rd Governor of the Colony of Rhode Island and Providence Plantations (d. 1776)
1783 – Philip P. Barbour, American farmer and politician, 12th Speaker of the United States House of Representatives (d. 1841)
1791 – Minh Mạng, Vietnamese emperor (d. 1841) 
1803 – Edward Bulwer-Lytton, English author, playwright, and politician, Secretary of State for the Colonies (d. 1873)
  1803   – Ralph Waldo Emerson, American poet and philosopher (d. 1882)
1818 – Jacob Burckhardt, Swiss historian and academic (d. 1897)
  1818   – Louise de Broglie, Countess d'Haussonville, French essayist and biographer (d. 1882)
1830 – Trebor Mai (né Robert Williams), Welsh poet (d. 1877)
1846 – Naim Frashëri, Albanian-Turkish poet and translator (d. 1900)
1848 – Johann Baptist Singenberger, Swiss composer, educator, and publisher (d. 1924)
1852 – William Muldoon, American wrestler and trainer (d. 1933)
1856 – Louis Franchet d'Espèrey, Algerian-French general (d. 1942)
1860 – James McKeen Cattell, American psychologist and academic (d. 1944)
1865 – John Mott, American evangelist and saint, Nobel Prize laureate (d. 1955)
  1865   – Pieter Zeeman, Dutch physicist and academic, Nobel Prize laureate (d. 1943)
  1865   – Mathilde Verne, English pianist and educator (d. 1936)
1867 – Anders Peter Nielsen, Danish target shooter (d. 1950)
1869 – Robbie Ross, Canadian journalist and art critic (d. 1918)
1878 – Bill Robinson, American actor and dancer (d. 1949)
1879 – Max Aitken, Lord Beaverbrook, Canadian-English businessman and politician, Chancellor of the Duchy of Lancaster (d. 1964)
  1879   – William Stickney, American golfer (d. 1944)
1880 – Jean Alexandre Barré, French neurologist and academic (d. 1967)
1882 – Marie Doro, American actress (d. 1956)
1883 – Carl Johan Lind, Swedish hammer thrower (d. 1965)
1886 – Rash Behari Bose, Indian soldier and activist (d. 1945)
  1886   – Philip Murray, Scottish-American miner and labor leader (d. 1952)
1887 – Padre Pio, Italian priest and saint (d. 1968)
1888 – Miles Malleson, English actor and screenwriter (d. 1969)
1889 – Günther Lütjens, German admiral (d. 1941)
  1889   – Igor Sikorsky, Russian-American aircraft designer, founded Sikorsky Aircraft (d. 1972)
1893 – Ernest "Pop" Stoneman, American country musician (d. 1968)
1897 – Alan Kippax, Australian cricketer (d. 1972)
  1897   – Gene Tunney, American boxer and soldier (d. 1978)
1898 – Bennett Cerf, American publisher and television game show panelist; co-founded Random House (d. 1971)
1899 – Kazi Nazrul Islam, Bengali poet, author, and flute player (d. 1976)
1900 – Alain Grandbois, Canadian poet and author (d. 1975)
1900 – George Lennon, Irish Republican Army leader during the Irish War of Independence and the Irish Civil War (d. 1991)

1901–present
1907 – U Nu, Burmese politician, 1st Prime Minister of Burma (d. 1995)
1908 – Theodore Roethke, American poet (d. 1963)
1909 – Alfred Kubel, German politician, 5th Prime Minister of Lower Saxony (d. 1999)
1912 – Dean Rockwell, American commander, wrestler, and coach (d. 2005)
1913 – Heinrich Bär, German colonel and pilot (d. 1957)
  1913   – Richard Dimbleby, English journalist and producer (d. 1965)
1916 – Brian Dickson, Canadian captain, lawyer, and politician, 15th Chief Justice of Canada (d. 1998)
  1916   – Giuseppe Tosi, Italian discus thrower (d. 1981)
1917 – Steve Cochran, American film, television and stage actor (d. 1965)
  1917   – Theodore Hesburgh, American priest, theologian, and academic (d. 2015)
1920 – Arthur Wint, Jamaican runner and diplomat (d. 1992)
1921 – Hal David, American songwriter and composer (d. 2012)
  1921   – Kitty Kallen, American singer (d. 2016)
  1921   – Jack Steinberger, German-Swiss physicist and academic, Nobel Prize laureate (d. 2020)
1922 – Enrico Berlinguer, Italian politician (d. 1984)
1924 – István Nyers, French-Hungarian footballer (d. 2005)
1925 – Rosario Castellanos, Mexican poet and author (d. 1974)
  1925   – Jeanne Crain, American actress (d. 2003)
  1925   – Eldon Griffiths, English journalist and politician (d. 2014)
  1925   – Don Liddle, American baseball player (d. 2000)
  1925   – Claude Pinoteau, French film director and screenwriter (d. 2012)
1926 – Claude Akins, American actor (d. 1994)
  1926   – William Bowyer, English painter and academic (d. 2015)
  1926   – Phyllis Gotlieb, Canadian author and poet (d. 2009)
  1926   – Bill Sharman, American basketball player and coach (d. 2013)
  1926   – David Wynne, English sculptor and painter (d. 2014)
1927 – Robert Ludlum, American soldier and author (d. 2001)
  1927   – Norman Petty, American singer-songwriter, pianist, and producer (d. 1984)
1929 – Beverly Sills, American soprano and actress (d. 2007)
1930 – Sonia Rykiel, French fashion designer (d. 2016)
1931 – Herb Gray, Canadian lawyer and politician, 7th Deputy Prime Minister of Canada (d. 2014)
  1931   – Georgy Grechko, Russian engineer and astronaut (d. 2017)
  1931   – Irwin Winkler, American director and producer
1932 – John Gregory Dunne, American novelist, screenwriter, and critic (d. 2003)
  1932   – K. C. Jones, American basketball player and coach (d. 2020)
1933 – Sarah Marshall, English-American actress (d. 2014)
  1933   – Basdeo Panday, Trinidadian lawyer and politician, 5th Prime Minister of Trinidad and Tobago
  1933   – Ray Spencer, English footballer (d. 2016)
  1933   – Jógvan Sundstein, Faroese accountant and politician, 7th Prime Minister of the Faroe Islands
1935 – John Ffowcs Williams, Welsh engineer and academic (d. 2020)
  1935   – Cookie Gilchrist, American football player (d. 2011)
  1935   – W. P. Kinsella,  Canadian novelist and short story writer (d. 2016)
  1935   – Victoria Shaw, Australian actress (d. 1988)
1936 – Tom T. Hall, American singer-songwriter and guitarist (d. 2021)
  1936   – Rusi Surti, Indian cricketer (d. 2013)
1937 – Tom Phillips, English painter and academic
1938 – Raymond Carver, American short story writer and poet (d. 1988)
  1938   – Margaret Forster, English historian, author, and critic (d. 2016)
  1938   – Geoffrey Robinson, English businessman and politician
1939 – Dixie Carter, American actress and singer (d. 2010)
  1939   – Ian McKellen, English actor
1940 – Nobuyoshi Araki, Japanese photographer
1941 – Rudolf Adler, Czech filmmaker
  1941   – Uta Frith, German developmental psychologist
  1941   – Vladimir Voronin, Moldovan economist and politician, 3rd President of Moldova
1943 – Jessi Colter, American singer-songwriter and pianist
  1943   – John Palmer, English keyboard player 
  1943   – Leslie Uggams, American actress and singer
1944 – Digby Anderson, English journalist and philosopher
  1944   – Pierre Bachelet, French singer-songwriter (d. 2005)
  1944   – Charlie Harper, English singer-songwriter and producer 
  1944   – Robert MacPherson, American mathematician and academic
  1944   – Frank Oz, English-born American puppeteer, filmmaker, and actor
  1944   – Chris Ralston, English rugby player
1946 – Bill Adam, Scottish-Canadian racing driver
  1946   – David A. Hargrave, American game designer, created Arduin (d. 1988)
1947 – Karen Valentine, American actress
  1947   – Catherine G. Wolf, American psychologist and computer scientist (d.2018)
1948 – Bülent Arınç, Turkish lawyer and politician, Deputy Prime Minister of Turkey
  1948   – Marianne Elliott, Northern Irish historian, author, and academic 
  1948   – Klaus Meine, German rock singer-songwriter
1949 – Jamaica Kincaid, Antiguan-American novelist, short story writer, and essayist
  1949   – Barry Windsor-Smith, English painter and illustrator
1950 – Robby Steinhardt, American rock violinist and singer (d. 2021) 
1951 – Bob Gale, American director, producer, and screenwriter
1952 – Jeffrey Bewkes, American businessman
  1952   – Nick Fotiu, American ice hockey player and coach
  1952   – David Jenkins, Trinidadian-Scottish runner
  1952   – Al Sarrantonio, American author and publisher
  1952   – Gordon H. Smith, American businessman and politician
1953 – Eve Ensler, American playwright and producer
  1953   – Daniel Passarella, Argentinian footballer, coach, and manager
  1953   – Stan Sakai, Japanese-American author and illustrator
  1953   – Gaetano Scirea, Italian footballer (d. 1989)
1954 – John Beck, English footballer and manager
  1954   – Murali, Indian actor, producer, and politician (d. 2009)
1955 – Alistair Burt, English lawyer and politician
1956 – Stavros Arnaoutakis, Greek politician
  1956   – Larry Hogan, American politician, 62nd Governor of Maryland
  1956   – Kevin Lynch (hunger striker), Irish Republican (d. 1981)
  1956   – David P. Sartor, American composer and conductor
1957 – Alastair Campbell, English journalist and author
  1957   – Edward Lee, American author
  1957   – Robert Picard, Canadian ice hockey player
1958 – Dorothy Straight, American children's author
  1958   – Paul Weller, English singer, songwriter and musician
1959 – Julian Clary, English comedian, actor, and author
  1959   – Manolis Kefalogiannis, Greek politician
  1959   – Rick Wamsley, Canadian ice hockey player and coach
1960 – Amy Klobuchar, American lawyer and politician
  1960   – Anthea Turner, English journalist and television host
1962 – Ric Nattress, Canadian ice hockey player, coach, and manager
1963 – George Hickenlooper, American director and producer (d. 2010)
  1963   – Mike Myers, Canadian-American actor, singer, producer, and screenwriter
  1963   – Ludovic Orban, Romanian engineer and politician, 68th Prime Minister of Romania
1964 – David Shaw, Canadian-American ice hockey player
1965 – Yahya Jammeh, Gambian colonel and politician, President of the Gambia
1967 – Luc Nilis, Belgian footballer and manager
  1967   – Mark Rosewater, head designer of Magic: the Gathering
  1967   – Andrew Sznajder, Canadian tennis player
1968 – Kendall Gill, American basketball player, boxer, and sportscaster
1969 – Glen Drover, Canadian guitarist and songwriter 
  1969   – Anne Heche, American actress (d. 2022)
  1969   – Karen Bernstein, Canadian voice actress
  1969   – Stacy London, American journalist and author
1970 – Robert Croft, Welsh-English cricketer and sportscaster
  1970   – Jamie Kennedy, American actor, producer, and screenwriter
  1970   – Octavia Spencer, American actress and author
1971 – Stefano Baldini, Italian runner
  1971   – Marco Cappato, Italian politician
1972 – Karan Johar, Indian actor, director, producer, and screenwriter
1973 – Daz Dillinger, American rapper and producer 
  1973   – Molly Sims, American model and actress 
1974 – Dougie Freedman, Scottish footballer and manager
  1974   – Frank Klepacki, American drummer and composer 
  1974   – Miguel Tejada, Dominican-American baseball player
1975 – Blaise Nkufo, Congolese-Swiss footballer
1976 – Stefan Holm, Swedish high jumper
  1976   – Erki Pütsep, Estonian cyclist
  1976   – Ethan Suplee, American actor
  1976   – Cillian Murphy, Irish actor
  1976   – Miguel Zepeda, Mexican footballer
1977 – Andre Anis, Estonian footballer
  1977   – Alberto Del Rio, Mexican-American mixed martial artist and wrestler
1978 – Adam Gontier, Canadian singer-songwriter and guitarist 
  1978   – Brian Urlacher, American football player
1979 – Carlos Bocanegra, American footballer and executive
  1979   – Sayed Moawad, Egyptian footballer
  1979   – Caroline Ouellette, Canadian ice hockey player and coach
  1979   – Sam Sodje, English-Nigerian footballer
  1979   – Jonny Wilkinson, English rugby player
  1979   – Chris Young, American baseball pitcher
1980 – David Navarro, Spanish footballer
1981 – Michalis Pelekanos, Greek basketball player
  1981   – Matt Utai, New Zealand rugby league player
1982 – Adam Boyd, English footballer
  1982   – Daniel Braaten, Norwegian footballer
  1982   – Ryan Gallant, American skateboarder
  1982   – Roger Guerreiro, Polish footballer
  1982   – Justin Hodges, Australian rugby league player
  1982   – Ezekiel Kemboi, Kenyan runner
  1982   – Jason Kubel, American baseball player
  1982   – Stacey Pensgen, American figure skater and meteorologist
  1982   – Luke Webster, Australian footballer
1984 – Luke Ball, Australian footballer
  1984   – Kyle Brodziak, Canadian ice hockey player
  1984   – A. J. Foyt IV, American race car driver
  1984   – Shawne Merriman, American football player
1985 – Luciana Abreu, Portuguese singer and actress 
  1985   – Demba Ba, French footballer
  1985   – Gert Kams, Estonian footballer
  1985   – Roman Reigns, American football player and wrestler
1986 – Edewin Fanini, Brazilian footballer
  1986   – Yoan Gouffran, French footballer
  1986   – Takahiro Hōjō, Japanese actor and musician
  1986   – Geraint Thomas, Welsh cyclist
1987 – Timothy Derijck, Belgian footballer
  1987   – Yves De Winter, Belgian footballer
  1987   – Moritz Stehling, German footballer
  1987   – Kamil Stoch, Polish ski jumper
1988 – Dávid Škutka, Slovak footballer
  1988   – Cameron van der Burgh, South African swimmer
1990 – Bo Dallas, American wrestler
  1990   – Nikita Filatov, Russian ice hockey player
1993 – James Porter, English cricketer
1994 – Matt Murray, Canadian ice hockey player
  1994   – Aly Raisman, American gymnast
1995 – Kagiso Rabada, South African cricketer
1996 – David Pastrňák, Czech ice hockey player
2000 – Claire Liu, American tennis player

Deaths

Pre-1600
 675 – Li Hong, Chinese prince (b. 652) 
 709 – Aldhelm, English-Latin bishop, poet, and scholar (b. 639)
 803 – Higbald of Lindisfarne, English bishop 
 912 – Xue Yiju, chancellor of Later Liang 
 916 – Flann Sinna, king of Meath
 939 – Yao Yanzhang, general of Chu
 986 – Abd al-Rahman al-Sufi, Muslim astronomer (b. 903)
 992 – Mieszko I of Poland (b. 935)
1085 – Pope Gregory VII (b. 1020)
1261 – Pope Alexander IV (b. 1185)
1452 – John Stafford, English archbishop and politician
1555 – Gemma Frisius, Dutch physician, mathematician, and cartographer (b. 1508)
  1555   – Henry II of Navarre (b. 1503)
1558 – Elisabeth of Brandenburg, Duchess of Brunswick-Calenberg-Göttingen (b. 1510)
1595 – Valens Acidalius, German poet and critic (b. 1567)

1601–1900
1607 – Mary Magdalene de' Pazzi, Italian Carmelite nun and mystic (b. 1566)
1632 – Adam Tanner, Austrian mathematician and philosopher (b. 1572)
1667 – Gustaf Bonde, Finnish-Swedish politician, 5th Lord High Treasurer of Sweden (b. 1620)
1681 – Pedro Calderón de la Barca, Spanish poet and playwright (b. 1600)
1741 – Daniel Ernst Jablonski, German bishop and theologian (b. 1660)
1786 – Peter III of Portugal (b. 1717)
1789 – Anders Dahl, Swedish botanist and physician (b. 1751)
1797 – John Griffin, 4th Baron Howard de Walden, English field marshal and politician, Lord Lieutenant of Essex (b. 1719)
1805 – William Paley, English priest and philosopher (b. 1743)
1849 – Benjamin D'Urban, English general and politician, Governor of British Guiana (b. 1777)
1895 – Ahmed Cevdet Pasha, Ottoman sociologist, historian, and jurist (b. 1822)
1899 – Rosa Bonheur, French painter and sculptor (b. 1822)

1901–present
1912 – Austin Lane Crothers, American educator and politician, 46th Governor of Maryland (b. 1860)
1917 – Maksim Bahdanovič, Belarusian poet and critic (b. 1891)
1919 – Eliza Pollock, American archer (b. 1840)
  1919   – Madam C. J. Walker, American businesswoman and philanthropist, founded the Madame C.J. Walker Manufacturing Company (b. 1867)
1924 – Lyubov Popova, Russian painter and illustrator (b. 1889)
1926 – Symon Petliura, Ukrainian journalist and politician (b. 1879)
1927 – Payne Whitney, American businessman and philanthropist (b. 1876)
1930 – Randall Davidson, Scottish-English archbishop (b. 1848)
1934 – Gustav Holst, English trombonist, composer, and educator (b. 1874)
1937 – Henry Ossawa Tanner, American-French painter and illustrator (b. 1859)
1939 – Frank Watson Dyson, English astronomer and academic (b. 1868)
1942 – Emanuel Feuermann, Ukrainian-American cellist and educator (b. 1902)
1943 – Nils von Dardel, Swedish painter (b. 1888)
1948 – Witold Pilecki, Polish officer and Resistance leader (b. 1901)
1951 – Paula von Preradović, Croatian poet and author (b. 1887)
1954 – Robert Capa, Hungarian photographer and journalist (b. 1913)
1957 – Leo Goodwin, American swimmer, diver, and water polo player (b. 1883)
1968 – Georg von Küchler, German field marshal (b. 1881)
1969 – Elisabeth Geleerd, Dutch-American psychoanalyst (b. 1909) 
1970 – Tom Patey, Scottish mountaineer and author (b. 1932)
1977 – Yevgenia Ginzburg, Russian author (b. 1904)
1979 – Itzhak Bentov, Czech-Israeli engineer, mystic, and author (b. 1923)
  1979   – Amédée Gordini, Italian-born French racing driver and sports car manufacturer (b. 1899)
1981 – Ruby Payne-Scott, Australian physicist and astronomer (b. 1912)
  1981   – Fredric Warburg, English author and publisher (b. 1898)
1983 – Necip Fazıl Kısakürek, Turkish author, poet, and playwright (b. 1904)
  1983   – Idris of Libya (b. 1889)
  1983   – Jack Stewart, Canadian-American ice hockey player (b. 1917)
1986 – Chester Bowles, American journalist and politician, 22nd Under Secretary of State (b. 1901)
1990 – Vic Tayback, American actor (b. 1930)
1995 – Élie Bayol, French racing driver (b. 1914)
  1995   – Krešimir Ćosić, Croatian basketball player and coach, Naismith Basketball Hall of Famer 1996 (b. 1948)
  1995   – Dany Robin, French actress (b. 1927)
1996 – Renzo De Felice, Italian historian and author (b. 1929)
2003 – Sloan Wilson, American author and poet (b. 1920)
2004 – Roger Williams Straus, Jr., American publisher, co-founded Farrar, Straus and Giroux Publishing Company (b. 1917)
2005 – Sunil Dutt, Indian actor, director, producer, and politician (b. 1929)
  2005   – Robert Jankel, English businessman, founded Panther Westwinds (b. 1938)
  2005   – Graham Kennedy, Australian television host and actor (b. 1934)
  2005   – Ismail Merchant, Indian-born film producer and director (b. 1936)
  2005   – Zoran Mušič, Slovene painter and illustrator (b. 1909)
2007 – Charles Nelson Reilly, American actor, comedian, and director (b. 1931)
2008 – J. R. Simplot, American businessman, founded Simplot (b. 1909)
2009 – Haakon Lie, Norwegian politician (b. 1905)
2010 – Alexander Belostenny, Ukrainian basketball player (b. 1959)
  2010   – Michael H. Jordan, American businessman (b. 1936)
  2010   – Alan Hickinbotham, Australian footballer and coach (b. 1925)
  2010   – Gabriel Vargas, Mexican painter and illustrator (b. 1915)
  2010   – Jarvis Williams, American football player and coach (b. 1965) 
2011 – Terry Jenner, Australian cricketer and coach (b. 1944)
2012 – William Hanley, American author and screenwriter (b. 1931)
  2012   – Peter D. Sieruta, American author and critic (b. 1958)
  2012   – Lou Watson, American basketball player and coach (b. 1924)
2013 – Mahendra Karma, Indian politician (b. 1950)
  2013   – Nand Kumar Patel, Indian politician (b. 1953)
2014 – David Allen, English cricketer (b. 1935)
  2014   – Marcel Côté, Canadian economist and politician (b. 1942)
  2014   – Wojciech Jaruzelski, Polish general and politician, 1st President of Poland (b. 1923)
  2014   – Herb Jeffries, American singer and actor (b. 1913)
  2014   – Toaripi Lauti, Tuvaluan educator and politician, 1st Prime Minister of Tuvalu (b. 1928)
  2014   – Matthew Saad Muhammad, American boxer and trainer (b. 1954)
2015 – George Braden, Canadian lawyer and politician, 2nd Premier of the Northwest Territories (b. 1949)
  2015   – Robert Lebel, Canadian bishop (b. 1924)
2018 – Kaduvetti Guru, Indian politician and Veera Vanniyar caste leader (b. 1961)
2019 – Claus von Bülow, Danish-British socialite (b. 1926)
2020 – George Floyd, African American man murdered by Minneapolis police officer Derek Chauvin (b. 1973)
2021 – John Warner, American attorney and politician (b. 1927)
  2021   – Lois Ehlert, American author and illustrator (b. 1934)
2022 – Morton L. Janklow, American literary agent (b. 1930)

Holidays and observances
Africa Day (African Union)
African Liberation Day (African Union, Rastafari)
Christian feast day:
Aldhelm
Bede
Canius
Dionysius of Milan
Dúnchad mac Cinn Fáelad
Gerard of Lunel
Madeleine Sophie Barat
Mary Magdalene de Pazzi
Maximus (Mauxe) of Évreux
Pope Boniface IV
Pope Gregory VII
Pope Urban I
Zenobius of Florence
May 25 (Eastern Orthodox liturgics)
First National Government / National Day (Argentina)
Geek Pride Day (geek culture)
Independence Day, celebrates the independence of Jordan from the United Kingdom in 1946.
Last bell (Russia, post-Soviet countries)
Liberation Day (Lebanon)
International Missing Children's Day  and its related observances:
National Missing Children's Day (United States),
National Tap Dance Day (United States)
Towel Day in honour of the work of the writer Douglas Adams

Notes

References

External links

 BBC: On This Day
 
 Historical Events on May 25

Days of the year
May